Nee Jathaga Nenundali is a 2014 Telugu romantic musical drama film directed by Jaya Ravindra. It is an official remake of 2013 film Aashiqui 2. The name is taken from the song of the same name from the 2014 film, Yevadu. Sachiin J. Joshi and Nazia Hussain are in lead roles.

Plot
Raghava Jairam (Sachiin J Joshi) – a successful singer and musician whose career is waning because of his alcohol addiction – is on stage in Goa when his performance is interrupted by his rival Varun (Aadarsh Balakrishna). After a fight, Raghav leaves the venue and drives to a local bar, where he meets Gayathri Nandan (Nazia), a bar singer who idolises him. Seeing her looking at a photograph of Lata Mangeshkar in the bar, and impressed by her voice, Raghava promises to transform her into a singing sensation, and asks her never to perform again in bars. Gayathri leaves her job and returns to Hyderabad with Raghav, who convinces record producer Sravan (Rao Ramesh) to meet her. Raghava is attacked and injured by some thugs, and his manager Vivek (Shashank) prevents the news being leaked to the media; instead he spreads the story that Raghav has left the country to perform abroad. After two months of unsuccessfully attempting to contact Raghav, a broken Gayathri is forced to sing in bars again.
Meanwhile, Raghav recovers from his injuries and starts searching for Gayathri. He learns that Vivek had ignored her calls without informing him. Raghav apologises to Gayathri and fires Vivek, and they meet Sravan to sign a recording agreement. Raghav begins to train Gayathri, who becomes a successful playback singer. When gossip spreads that Raghav is using her as a servant, he relapses into alcohol addiction. Gayathri comforts him and they spend the night together. Despite her mother's disapproval, she moves in with Raghav and things go well until his addiction worsens, causing him to become aggressive and violent.
Gayathri attempts to rehabilitate Raghav, sacrificing her singing career in doing so. After Sravan reminds them about their dream of Gayathri becoming a successful singer, Raghav tells her to focus on her work. During Gayathri's stage show, Raghav meets a journalist who accuses him of using Gayathri for pleasure and money. Raghav beats up the journalist and starts drinking. He ends up in jail, and Gayathri comes to bail him out. Raghav overhears Gayathri telling Sravan that she is going to give up her career because Raghav is more important to her. He sees that he has become a burden and that leaving her is his only option to save her. The next day, he bids her farewell by assuring her that he will change his lifestyle and dies in a road accident. Distraught by Raghav's death, Gayathri decides to give up her career but Vivek persuades her to stay, reminding her that Raghav wanted her to become a successful singer and killed himself because he did not want to be an obstacle in the path of her success. Gayathri agrees, and returns to singing. After four years she is shown with her 4-year-old son, whose name is Raghava Jairam.

Cast and characters
 Sachiin J Joshi as Raghav Jayaram a.k.a. R.Jay
 Nazia Hussain as Gayatri Nandana
 Rao Ramesh as Sravan
 Shashank as Vivek
 Aadarsh Balakrishna as Archrival from the Spectators
 Posani Krishna Murali as Bar owner
 Shubhangi Latkar as Gayatri's mother

Production
A song was shot at the Anata River in Thailand.

Soundtrack
The songs were reused from the original.

References

External links 
 
 

2014 films
Indian romantic musical films
Telugu remakes of Hindi films
Films scored by Jeet Ganguly
Films scored by Mithoon
Films scored by Ankit Tiwari
Indian romantic drama films
2010s Telugu-language films
Films shot in Goa
Films shot in Poland
2014 romantic drama films
2010s romantic musical films